

Players

Competitions

Division Three

League table

Results summary

League position by match

Matches

FA Cup

Coca-Cola Cup

Autoglass Trophy

Appearances and goals

References

Books

1993-94
Northampton Town
Northampton Town